Stolen Love is a 1928 American silent drama film directed by Lynn Shores and starring Marceline Day and Rex Lease. The plot was adapted from a story by Hazel Livingston.

Cast
Marceline Day as Joan Hastings
Rex Lease as Bill
Owen Moore as Curtis Barlow
Helen Lynch as Ruth
Blanche Frederici as Aunt Evvie
Joy Winthrop as Aunt Babe
Betty Blythe as Modiste

Critical reception
A review in Harrison's Reports summarized the film as "Only fair . . . an old story, told in a conventional way". It complimented Day's "very good performance" and described Lease as "likeable as the hero", but it described Moore's acting as "in colorless manner".

Preservation status
The Library of Congress Silent Survival Catalog shows no holdings.

References

External links

1928 films
American silent feature films
Film Booking Offices of America films
American black-and-white films
Silent American drama films
1928 drama films
Films directed by Lynn Shores
1920s American films